

Lady of Mayenne

First House of Mayenne, ?–?

Second House of Mayenne, ?–1264

Baroness of Mayenne

House of Avaugour, 1264–1331/4

House of Dreux, 1331/4–1384 
None

House of Châtillon, 1384–1481 
None

House of Valois-Anjou, 1404–1481

House of Lorraine, 1481–1544

Marquise of Mayenne

House of Lorraine, 1544–1573

Duchess of Mayenne

House of Lorraine, 1573–1621

House of Gonzaga, 1621–1654

House of Mazarin, 1654–1781 

Due to various entailments, Louise-Jeanne could not pass on the title, which became extinct at her death. Her daughter, Louise-Félicité d'Aumont, married Honoré IV, Prince of Monaco, and their descendants still claim the title.

See also 
 List of consorts of Maine
 List of consorts of Anjou
 List of consorts of Elbeuf
 List of consorts of Lorraine
 List of consorts of Nevers
 List of consorts of Rethel
 List of Monegasque consorts

Sources 
 
 

Mayenne
Dukes of Mayenne